The following is a list of the published works of James M. McPherson, an American Civil War historian.

Works

 The Struggle for Equality: Abolitionists and the Negro in the Civil War and Reconstruction. Princeton, NJ: Princeton University Press, 1964 (1st ed.); 1995 (2nd ed., with a new preface by the author). 
 The Negro's Civil War: How American Negroes Felt and Acted During the War for the Union. New York: Pantheon Books, 1965.
 Marching Toward Freedom: The Negro in the Civil War, 1861-1865. New York: Knopf, 1968 (1st ed.); New York: Facts on File, 1991 (revised and updated ed.).
 The Abolitionist Legacy: From Reconstruction to the NAACP. Princeton, NJ: Princeton University Press, 1975 (1st ed.); 1995 (2nd ed., with a new preface by the author).
 Ordeal by Fire: The Civil War and Reconstruction. New York: Knopf, 1982 (1st ed.); New York: McGraw-Hill, c1992 (2nd ed.); c2001 (3rd ed.), c2010 (4th ed.).  
 Lincoln and the Strategy of Unconditional Surrender. Gettysburg, PA: Gettysburg College, 1984.
 How Lincoln Won the War with Metaphors. Fort Wayne, IN: Louis A. Warren Lincoln Library and Museum, 1985.
 Battle Cry of Freedom: The Civil War Era. New York: Oxford University Press, 1988 (1st ed.); New York: Ballantine Books, 1989 (1st Ballantine Books ed.); New York: Oxford University Press, 2003 (Illustrated ed.) ; New York: Oxford University Press. .
 Abraham Lincoln and the Second American Revolution (essays). New York: Oxford University Press, 1991.  
 What They Fought For, 1861-1865. Baton Rouge: Louisiana State University Press, 1994. 
 Drawn with the Sword: Reflections on the American Civil War (essays). New York: Oxford University Press, 1996. 
 For Cause and Comrades: Why Men Fought in the Civil War. New York: Oxford University Press, 1997. 
 Is Blood Thicker than Water?: Crises of Nationalism in the Modern World. Toronto: Vintage Canada, c1998. 
 Crossroads of Freedom: Antietam. Oxford; New York: Oxford University Press, 2002.   
 The Boys in Blue and Gray. New York: Atheneum Books for Young Readers, c2002.
 Hallowed Ground: A Walk at Gettysburg. New York: Crown Journeys, 2003. 
 This Mighty Scourge: Perspectives on the Civil War (essays). New York: Oxford University Press, 2007. 
 Tried by War: Abraham Lincoln as Commander in Chief. 2008. 
 Abraham Lincoln. Oxford University Press, 2009. 
 War on the Waters: The Union & Confederate Navies, 1861-1865. Chapel Hill: The University of North Carolina Press, 2012. 
 Embattled Rebel: Jefferson Davis as Commander in Chief. Penguin Press, 2014. 
 The War That Forged a Nation: Why the Civil War Still Matters.  Oxford University Press, 2015.

As editor or contributor
 Blacks in America: Bibliographical Essays by James M. McPherson and others. 1st ed. Garden City, N.Y., Doubleday, 1971.
 Region, Race, and Reconstruction: Essays in Honor of C. Vann Woodward, edited by J. Morgan Kousser and James M. McPherson. New York: Oxford University Press, 1982.
 Battle Chronicles of the Civil War, James McPherson, editor; Richard Gottlieb, managing editor. 6 vols. New York: Macmillan Pub. Co.; London: Collier Macmillan Publishers, c1989.
 American Political Leaders: From Colonial Times to the Present, by Steven G. O'Brien; editor, Paula McGuire; consulting editors, James M. McPherson, Gary Gerstle. Santa Barbara, Calif.: ABC-CLIO, c1991. .
 Why the Confederacy Lost, edited by Gabor S. Boritt; essays by James M. McPherson et al. New York: Oxford University Press, 1992.
 Gettysburg: The Paintings of Mort Künstler, text by James M. McPherson. Atlanta, GA: Turner Publishing, c1993.
 The Atlas of the Civil War, edited by James M. McPherson. New York: Macmillan, c1994.
 "We Cannot Escape History": Lincoln and the Last Best Hope of Earth, edited by James M. McPherson. Urbana: University of Illinois Press, 1995. .
 The American Heritage New History of the Civil War, narrated by Bruce Catton; edited and with a new introduction by James McPherson. New York: Viking, 1996. .
 Personal Memoirs of U.S. Grant, by Ulysses S. Grant; with an introduction and notes by James M. McPherson. New York: Penguin Books, 1999. .
 Encyclopedia of Civil War Biographies, edited by James M. McPherson. 3 vols. Armonk, NY: Sharpe Reference, c2000. .
 To the Best of My Ability: The American Presidents, edited by James M. McPherson and David Rubel. London: Dorling Kindersley, c2000, .
 What If?: The World's Foremost Military Historians Imagine What Might Have Been, If the Lost Order Hadn't Been Lost, written by James M. McPherson. Robert Cowley, G.P. Putnam's Sons, 2000
 Reprinted in What Ifs? of American History: Eminent Historians Imagine What Might Have Been, Robert Cowley, G.P. Putnam's Sons, 2003
 The Gettysburg Address: Perspectives on Lincoln's Greatest Speech, edited by Sean Conant; essays by various, foreword by James M. McPherson. New York: Oxford University Press, 2015. 

Bibliographies by writer
Bibliographies of American writers
American Civil War books